Steve or Stephen Bennett may refer to:

Sports
Stephen Bennett (golfer) (born 1959), English professional golfer
Steve Bennett (referee) (born 1961), English football referee
Stephen Bennett (hurler) (born 1995), Irish hurler
Steven Bennett (footballer) (born 1991), English footballer

Politicians
Stephen Bennett (Australian politician) (born 1964), Queensland state MP
Stephen O. Bennett (1807–1886), legislator from Wisconsin
Steve Bennett (California politician), California state representative

Others
Stephen James Bennett, English musician and producer
Steve Bennett (entrepreneur), head of Starchaser, a company involved in space development and tourism
Steve Bennett, manga artist and head of manga publisher Studio Ironcat
Steve Bennett (software entrepreneur), American businessman
Steve Bennett (jewelry entrepreneur) (born 1966), founder of several UK shopping channel businesses
Steven L. Bennett (1946–1972), U.S. pilot posthumously awarded the Medal of Honor
Steve Bennett, founder of the Chortle website